H. intermedia  may refer to:
 Hexatoma intermedia, a crane fly species
 Helina intermedia, a fly species in the genus Helina
 Heringia intermedia, a hoverfly species in the genus Heringia
 Hilara intermedia, a dance fly species in the genus Hilara
 Hydrogenophaga intermedia, a bacterium species in the genus Hydrogenophaga
 Hyla intermedia, the Italian tree frog, a frog species found in Italy, Slovenia and Switzerland

Synonyms
 Hecatera intermedia, a synonym for Hecatera bicolorata, the broad-barred white, a moth species found throughout Europe and in Asia

See also
 Intermedia (disambiguation)